Ignacio "Nacho" de Loyola Abeledo Rute (born 5 January 1996) is a Spanish footballer who plays for CD San Roque de Lepe as a left winger.

Club career
Born in Huelva, Andalusia, Abeledo joined Real Betis' youth setup in 2011, aged 15. On 15 April 2013 he signed a professional contract with the club.

On 28 November 2013, while still a junior, Abeledo appeared on the bench in a 0–1 away loss against Lyon, in that season's UEFA Europa League. In January of the following year he made his senior debuts with the reserves in the Tercera División; shortly after he made his first-team debut, coming on as a late substitute in a 1–0 home win over Athletic Bilbao, in that season's Copa del Rey.

On 6 June 2016 Abeledo signed a three-year deal with another reserve team, FC Barcelona B, also playing in the third tier. On 2 September of the following year, he joined Málaga CF and was assigned to the B-team in the fourth division.

On 4 August 2018, after scoring a career-best 19 goals, Abeledo signed a two-year contract with Gimnàstic de Tarragona of the Segunda División, after terminating his contract with Málaga. The following 8 January, after being rarely used, he was loaned to Deportivo Fabril until June.

International career
On 14 January 2013 Abeledo was called up for the Spain under-17's, Nine days later he appeared as a second-half substitute of a 1–0 success over Italy.

References

External links

Beticopedia profile 

1996 births
Living people
Spanish footballers
Footballers from Huelva
Association football wingers
Segunda División players
Segunda División B players
Tercera División players
Real Betis players
FC Barcelona Atlètic players
Atlético Malagueño players
Gimnàstic de Tarragona footballers
Deportivo Fabril players
CD San Roque de Lepe footballers
Spain youth international footballers